H. aspera may refer to:
 Hibbertia aspera, the rough Guinea flower, a shrub species native to Australia
 Hydrangea aspera, a shrub species native to the region between the Himalaya, across southern China to Taiwan
 Hyphodontia aspera, a fungal plant pathogen species
 Hypolepis aspera, a fern species in the genus Hypolepis

See also 
 Aspera (disambiguation)